Aeropsis is a genus of sea urchins in the family Aeropsidae.

Two species are recognized:

References

Spatangoida
Echinoidea genera